The Model 98a rifle (Karabin wzór 98a, abbreviated to Kb wz.98a) was a Polish derivative of the German Gewehr 98 bolt-action rifle.

History 
After gaining independence, the Polish Army was armed mainly with a mixture of Russian, Austrian and German rifles. French rifles also were brought to Poland by returning Blue Army soldiers.  As a result, at the end of the Polish-Soviet War in 1921, the Polish army was armed with approximately 24 types of guns and 22 types of rifles, all firing different ammunition. Since such a combination of designs adversely affected training and logistics, work on one standard rifle was carried out starting in 1919. Initially, it was assumed that the Lebel would be adopted, but it was quickly rejected as an obsolete design. Later on, proposals for adoption as a standard rifle included the Mannlicher M1895 or Steyr M1912 Mauser.

The situation changed when the Council of Ambassadors resolution of 10 March 1921 ordered the transfer of machinery, equipment, documentation, and large stocks of raw materials from the former Prussian Royal Arsenal in Danzig to Poland. During World War I, this factory produced the Gewehr 98, facilitating the choice of the Mauser 98 action as the basis for any new Polish military rifle. After the transfer, production of the Kb wz.98, the Polish copy of the standard Gewehr 98 started in Radom and Warsaw in 1922.  In 1924, after approximately 22,000 rifles were manufactured, wz.98 production ended.  The Kbk wz.29 carbine eventually started to replace the wz.98 rifles in 1930.

With changes in Polish military policy in the early 1930s, the kbk wz.29 carbines no longer met the requirements.  In 1934, Poland decided to start production of an improved version of the wz.98 rifle, the wz.98a. The new rifle differed from its predecessor in that it had a new notch sight and possessed the improved bayonet attachment of the wz.29.  In 1936, production started at the National Arms Factory in Radom. The two-year delay was caused by difficulty finding an acceptable source of wood for the rifle stocks.

Before the outbreak of war in 1939, 44,500 wz.98a rifles were produced. They were one of the basic armaments of the Polish army. Captured wz.98 rifles were also taken into service by the Wehrmacht as the Gewehr 299 (p).

Technical overview 
The wz.98a rifle is mechanically identical to the German Gewehr 98 rifle.  It is a bolt-action repeating rifle, using a rotating bolt turned 90 degrees to lock or unlock. It has two locking lugs at the front of the bolt, with a safety lug at the rear.  Ammunition was fed from a fixed double stack box magazine holding five rounds.  The safety is mounted on the rear of the bolt assembly.  The rifle was fitted with iron sights, a tapered front sight blade and a tangent-type rear sight with a V-shaped notch, graduated from 100 to 2000 meters in 100 meters increments.  The rifle used the bayonets wz.22, wz.24, wz.25, wz.27, wz.28 or wz.29.

Bibliography 
 Zbigniew Nail, Piotr Zarzycki, the Polish construction arms, SIGMA NOT 1993. 
 Roman Matuszewski, Ireneusz J. Wojciechowski, TBiU no. 91 Mauser rifle wz. 1898, WMON 1983. 
 Instruction on infantry weapons, repeating rifle Mauser wz syst. 1898, Publisher Bookshop Military Min Spr. Prov 1928

Bolt-action rifles of Poland
World War II infantry weapons of Poland
7.92×57mm Mauser rifles